John Byng may refer to:
 John Byng (1704–1757), British Admiral in the Seven Years' War, executed for "fail[ing] to do his utmost"
 John Byng, 5th Viscount Torrington (1743–1813), British peer and diarist
 John Byng, 1st Earl of Strafford (1772–1860), British peer, politician and soldier during the Napoleonic Wars

See also
Jon Bing, Norwegian writer and law professor
Jonathan Bing, New York politician